Jean St Clair (23 September 1920 – 29 June 1973) was an English actress. She was born in Dublin, Ireland as Jean Margaret Alice St Clair. Her father was a Lieutenant in the 21st Lancers, stationed in Kildare, County Kildare. She made several film appearances which included The Great St Trinian's Train Robbery in 1966.

From 1952 to 1969 she was married to the art dealer Jack Baer. They had one daughter. She was imprisoned in HMP Holloway in the early 1970s for arson, after she set fire to Jack Baer's art gallery. She died in Kensington, London in 1973 aged 52.

Selected filmography
 The Gentle Gunman (1952) - Rosie O'Flaherty (uncredited)
 The Oracle (1953) - Young Girl
 Meet Mr. Malcolm (1954) - Mrs O’Connor
 Impulse (1954)
 Eight O'Clock Walk (1954) - Mrs. Gurney
 Aunt Clara (1954) - Alice Cole (uncredited)
 John and Julie (1955) - Miss Forbes
 Doctor at Large (1957) - O'Malley's Char (uncredited)
 Hell Drivers (1957) - Spinster
 The Young and the Guilty (1958) - Mrs. Humbolt, Marshall's Neighbor 
 Dentist in the Chair (1960) - Lucy
 The Great St Trinian's Train Robbery (1966) - Drunken Dolly
Les Grandes vacances (1967) - Mrs Mac Farrell
 Carry On Doctor (1967) - Mrs. Smith
 Fumo di Londra (1971) - The Gentleman (final film role)

Television
 Dad's Army series 3 episode 1  (11/09/1969) - Miss Meadows

References

External links

1920 births
1973 deaths
British film actresses
British television actresses
Actresses from Dublin (city)